NGC 1406 is almost edge-on barred spiral galaxy in constellation Fornax. It was discovered by John Herschel on 18 November 1835.

It is a member of Fornax Cluster, a cluster of 200 galaxies. At a distance of 50 million light-years, it is one of the closest members of the Fornax cluster. NGC 1406 has a Hubble classification of SBbc, which indicates it is a barred spiral galaxy. It is also edge-on, making its bar hard to see. NGC 1406 has much dust in its disc, which is visible on the Hubble image in the box upper right.

Its size on night sky is  3.9' x 0.7' which is proportional to real size of 75,000 light-years. This means NGC 1406 is one of the larger galaxies in Fornax Cluster. It is north and distant from central galaxy NGC 1399, so it position in the Fornax Cluster is at the edge of it.

References

External links 
 

Barred spiral galaxies
Fornax Cluster
Astronomical objects discovered in 1835
1406
Fornax (constellation)
013458